Extraskeletal chondroma is a cutaneous condition, a rare benign tumor of mature cartilage.

See also 
 List of cutaneous conditions

References 

Dermal and subcutaneous growths
Osseous and chondromatous neoplasia